Virginia Long  (born March 1, 1942) is a former justice on the  New Jersey Supreme Court. She is currently Counsel in the Princeton, N.J. office of Fox Rothschild.

Biography
Virginia Long graduated from Dunbarton College of the Holy Cross in 1963 and Rutgers School of Law—Newark in 1966. She has served as a Deputy Attorney General and was the Director of the New Jersey Division of Consumer Affairs and Commissioner of the New Jersey Department of Banking. She was appointed to the New Jersey Superior Court in 1978, and was elevated to the Appellate Division in 1984.

Justice Long became a presiding judge in 1995. She was nominated by Governor Christine Todd Whitman on June 17, 1999, to serve on the New Jersey Supreme Court. Her position was confirmed by the New Jersey Senate on June 21, 1999, and was sworn in on September 1, 1999. On June 21, 2006, the state Senate granted her tenure following the initial seven years.  She retired from the New Jersey Supreme Court on March 1, 2012, and was subsequently appointed chair of the NJ Advisory Committee on Judicial Conduct. In 2018, she was appointed by New Jersey Governor Phil Murphy as a member of the Judicial Advisory Panel, and has been additionally appointed in 2022 by the Supreme Court of New Jersey to chair the newly created Committee to Analyze
Duration of Disbarment.  She also currently is of counsel at Fox Rothschild.

Personal life
Justice Long is married to Jonathan D. Weiner, a partner at Fox Rothschild of Philadelphia and Princeton, N.J., and has three children, Bernardita, John, and Jane.

References

External links
Virginia Long, Counsel, Fox Rothschild LLP

1942 births
Living people
New Jersey lawyers
Justices of the Supreme Court of New Jersey
Rutgers School of Law–Newark alumni
State cabinet secretaries of New Jersey
American women judges
21st-century American women
20th-century American women judges
20th-century American judges
21st-century American women judges
21st-century American judges